College of Air Warfare (CAW) is a defence service training institution of the Indian Air Force. The college conducts courses and programmes in the art of Joint Warfare, with special emphasis on employment of Air Power.
The functional and the administrative control of the college is with the Training Command of the IAF. The current Commandant of the College is Air Vice Marshal Manish Khanna

History 
The College was established on 1 July 1959 and was initially known as School of Land and Air Warfare (SLAW) situated at New Delhi. After receiving the approval from the President of India, SLAW moved to its present location in Secunderabad on 25 July 1959. Air Commodore K L Sondhi was the first Commandant. The College was inaugurated by the then Minister of Defence, V. K. Krishna Menon formally, on 3 September 1959.
The School of Land Warfare was renamed as the Joint Air Warfare School (JAWS) on 25 November 1967, with the introduction of Naval aspects of warfare.
It was renamed the "College of Air Warfare" in January 1976 after the IAF received sanction from the President on 9 November 1975.

Location
The College is located on the busy Sardar Patel Road in Secunderabad. It overlooks the expanse of the General K. V. Krishna Rao Parade Ground. The campus is situated about 1.5 km from the Secunderabad Junction railway station and the Begumpet Airport.

Courses
CAW conducts the following courses
 Higher Air Command Course (HACC)
 Basic Professional Knowledge Course-Flying (BPKC-F)
 Ground Liaison Officers Course (GLOC)
 Senior Officers Study Period (SOSP)
 Combined Operational Review and Evaluation Programme

Objectives
The training objectives of the College are:
 To assist in development of Air Force doctrines, concepts and strategy.
 To study and teach 'Air Power' and conduct training in concepts of Air Warfare.
 To conduct training in Joint Air Operations for officers of Army, Navy and Air Force.
 To conduct computer aided War-Games of the Air War.
 To establish and maintain liaison with similar organisations in the other countries.
 To impart training to junior and middle level officers of the Indian Air Force in leadership and behavioural sciences, so as to improve their qualities of leadership and man management.
 To research, compile and publish books on IAF Personalities, Institutions, Campaigns and Squadrons.

List of Commandants

See also
 Army War College, Mhow
 Naval War College, Goa
 Indian National Defence University
 Military Academies in India
 Tactics and Air Combat and Defence Establishment (TACDE)
 Vijeta-1982 Hindi film

References 

Indian Air Force
Military education and training in India
1959 establishments in Andhra Pradesh
Educational institutions established in 1959